Aina Erlander (née Andersson; 28 September 1902 – 24 February 1990) was a Swedish lecturer and the wife of Swedish Prime Minister Tage Erlander from 1930 until his death in June 1985.

Aina Erlander's father was a mill and factory owner active in right wing politics. Erlander attended a girls school and gymnasium, and then continued her studies in Lund. In 1923, she met Tage Erlander, a fellow student in Lund; they married in 1930 and had two children. Aina worked as a teacher at Södra flickläroverket in Stockholm when Tage Erlander became Prime Minister of Sweden in October 1946.

Aina Erlander was a member of the board of Save the Children and in 1949 travelled to the then West Germany, suffering the effects of World War II. In 1954 she visited the Netherlands, which had been flooded in 1953. In 1957 Erlander became chairperson of Unga Örnar (sv) ('Young Eagles', a children's and youth rights organisation affiliated to the International Falcon Movement – Socialist Educational International), a position she retained for nine years. 

Following the death of her husband in 1985, she sorted and edited his papers.
.

References

Further reading 
 

1902 births
1990 deaths
20th-century Swedish people
Spouses of prime ministers of Sweden
Swedish schoolteachers